Malaysia–Sri Lanka relations refers to bilateral foreign relations between Malaysia and Sri Lanka. Malaysia has a high commission in Colombo, and Sri Lanka has a high commission in Kuala Lumpur. Both countries are members of the Commonwealth of Nations and the Group of 77.

History 
Relations between Sri Lanka and Southeast Asian countries has started since a long time ago  when Sri Lanka became the main entrance to the Bay of Bengal. During the time, there are connection between Sri Lanka and the Malay Peninsula due to trade activities. Some proof also can be found in a book by S. Paranavitana with a title "Ceylon and Malaysia" which published in 1961.

In the modern times, the current diplomatic relations has been establish since 1957, President Chandrika Kumaratunga made a state visit on 1997 and several memorandum of understanding (MoU) has been signed during the meeting.

In 2016 December President Maithripala Sirisena made 3-day state visit to Malaysia, to improve relationship the two countries. Several memorandum of understanding (MoU) has been signed during the meeting with Prime Minister Najib Razak

Economic relations 
Malaysia is one of the major trade partners of Sri Lanka, and among the leading investors in the country with the trade relations are expected to reach U$1 billion in 2015. In 2011, trade between the two countries reached U$814 million with exports from Malaysia amounting to U$644 million while imports accounted to U$169 million. A joint commission also focused on some issues for both sides especially on economic and commercial matters, technical and scientific co-operation and in areas such as tourism, culture, sports, immigration and human resources development. In 2018 Malaysia has called for a free trade agreement (FTA) to be signed with Sri Lanka.

See also 
 Sri Lankans in Malaysia

References 

 
Sri Lanka
Bilateral relations of Sri Lanka
Sri Lanka
Malaysia